Guma railway station is a small railway station in North 24 Parganas district, West Bengal. Its code is GUMA. It serves the town of Guma. The station consists of two well sheltered platforms. It has many facilities including water and sanitation.

The station

Location
Guma is located on Sealdah–Hasnabad–Bangaon–Ranaghat line of Kolkata Suburban Railway. Link between Dum Dum to Khulna now in Bangladesh, via Bangaon was constructed by Bengal Central Railway Company in 1882–84. The Sealah–Dum Dum–Barasat–Ashok Nagar–Bangaon sector was electrified in 1963–64.

Accommodations and facilities
A well maintained public toilet is available, as well as drinking water, a garden, and an ATVM (Automatic Ticket Vending Machine) as well.

See also

References

External links 

 Guma Station Map

Sealdah railway division
Railway stations in North 24 Parganas district
Kolkata Suburban Railway stations